Héctor Jesús Martínez (born 30 September 1947) is an Argentine former footballer.

See also
NASL stats

References

1947 births
Living people
Association football midfielders
Argentine footballers
Argentine expatriate footballers
Expatriate soccer players in the United States
Argentine expatriate sportspeople in the United States
National Professional Soccer League (1967) players
North American Soccer League (1968–1984) players
American Soccer League (1933–1983) players
Baltimore Bays players
Washington Darts players
Baltimore Bays (1972–73) players
Newell's Old Boys footballers
Club Atlético Independiente footballers
Club Atlético Huracán footballers
Club Atlético Huracán managers
Argentine football managers